Cyril Parry is the name of:

Cyril Parry (cricketer) (1900–1984), Australian cricketer
Cyril Parry (footballer) (born 1937), English footballer